Iravatheeswarar Temple, Thirukottaram (ஐராவதீசுவரர் கோயில், திருக்கொட்டாரம்) is a Hindu temple located in the village of Thirukottaram in the Tiruvarur district of Tamil Nadu, India. Constructed by the Medieval Cholas about 1000 years ago, the temple is dedicated to Shiva. The temple is situated on the banks of the Vanchiyaru River a tributary of the Kaveri River.

Legend 

According to Hindu mythology, the king of the gods Indra and his elephant Airavata once showed disrespect to the sage Durvasa. As a result, the sage cursed both of them. Airavata was born on earth as a wild elephant and was relieved of the curse only after he had spent one hundred years visiting Hindu holy sites. Thirukottaram was one of the sites visited.

Significance 

It is one of the shrines of the 275 Paadal Petra Sthalams. Praises of the temple have been sung by Sambandar in the Thevaram. The Thevaram is inscribed on the walls of the temple within the sanctum sanctorum. There are also inscriptions by Kulothunga Chola I who claims to be the builder of the temple.

Shrines 

The presiding deity is Shiva. There are also shrines for Ganesha, Bhairava, Murugan, Ardhanarisvara, Surya and Chandra.

References

External links

Photogallery

Shiva temples in Tiruvarur district
10th-century Hindu temples
Padal Petra Stalam